The Yamaha KX-5 is a MIDI controller and has no actual sounds on board. It was created by Yamaha in 1986. It also featured a ribbon controller which could be used for pitch bend. It is powered by 6 AA batteries which has a run time for up to 7 hours.

Keyboard
It has 37 Keys which range from  C2-C5.

Finishes
The unit was produced in both silver and black.

Custom Version
A custom version was built specifically for Jean-Michel Jarre to use in his concert in Lyon in 1986.

References

External links

CS-60
Digital synthesizers
MIDI controllers